WRHM (107.1 FM) is the flagship station of Interstate 107, the branding of two country music format stations in Rock Hill, South Carolina (107.1 WRHM) and Chesterfield, South Carolina (107.3 FM WVSZ).

About
Officially licensed to Lancaster, South Carolina, Interstate 107 broadcasts from the WRHI/WRHM studios at 142 North Confederate Ave. near Downtown Rock Hill. WRHM is a country music formatted station, but also airs University of South Carolina football, basketball, baseball, Interstate 107 also carries NASCAR races from the Motor Racing Network and the Performance Racing Network.

Simulcast
WRHM programming is also simulcast on WVSZ, licensed to Chesterfield, South Carolina. WVSZ's main studio is that of WCRE AM in Cheraw, South Carolina.

HD channel
The HD2 channel airs a Contemporary Christian format known as "The Bridge." It is relayed on translator W281BE.

History
WRHM was called WLCM-FM and WPAJ when it was in Lancaster, and the format was soft adult contemporary. The station aired Atlanta Braves baseball.

External links

Country radio stations in the United States
Radio stations in South Carolina
Radio stations in the Charlotte metropolitan area
York County, South Carolina
Lancaster County, South Carolina
Rock Hill, South Carolina
Radio stations established in 1964
1964 establishments in South Carolina